Geissolepis is a genus of flowering plants in the family Asteraceae.

Species
There is only one known species, Geissolepis suaedifolia, endemic to the State of San Luis Potosí in northeastern Mexico.

References

Astereae
Monotypic Asteraceae genera
Endemic flora of Mexico